The Counterfeit Cat is a 1949 MGM animated film directed by Tex Avery.

Synopsis 
A cat steals the headpiece of a dog to deceive the bulldog Spike and get a chance to eat the canary Spike is guarding.

Voice cast 
 Tex Avery and Bill Thompson as Spike
 Colleen Collins as Lady

References

External links 
 
 

Films directed by Tex Avery
1949 animated films
1949 short films
Metro-Goldwyn-Mayer animated short films
1940s animated short films
1940s American animated films
Animated films about cats
Films scored by Scott Bradley
1949 films
Animated films about dogs
Films produced by Fred Quimby
Metro-Goldwyn-Mayer cartoon studio short films
1940s English-language films